The following are the Pulitzer Prizes for 1990.

Two awards for Public Service were given in 1990. 1990 was also the last year that awards were given for General News Reporting and Specialized Reporting - these categories were changed to Spot News Reporting and Beat Reporting the following year.

Journalism awards

Letters awards 
Fiction:
The Mambo Kings Play Songs of Love by Oscar Hijuelos (Farrar)
History:
In Our Image: America's Empire in the Philippines by Stanley Karnow (Random House)
Biography or Autobiography:
Machiavelli in Hell by Sebastian de Grazia (Princeton University Press)
Poetry:
The World Doesn't End by Charles Simic (Harcourt Brace Jovanovich)
General Non-Fiction:
And Their Children After Them by Dale Maharidge and Michael Williamson (Pantheon)

Arts awards 
Drama:
The Piano Lesson by August Wilson (Plume)
Music:
Duplicates: A Concerto for Two Pianos and Orchestra by Mel Powell (G. Schirmer)
Premiered by the Los Angeles Philharmonic on January 26, 1990.

References

External links
 

Pulitzer Prize
Pulitzer Prizes by year
Pulitzer Prize